Men's freestyle 57 kg competition at the 2015 European Games in Baku, Azerbaijan, took place on 17 June at the Heydar Aliyev Arena.

Schedule
All times are Azerbaijan Summer Time (UTC+05:00)

Results 
Legend
D — Disqualified
F — Won by fall

Final

Top half

D Andreyeu and Khinchegashvili originally won their quarterfinal bouts, but were  ejected from the competition after their semi-final ended in a double disqualification due to the match degenerating into a brawl. Accordingly, both Ewald and Islamaj, who they had defeated, were reinstated.

Bottom half

Repechage

References

External links

Wrestling at the 2015 European Games